Open the Gates is the fourth album by the American heavy metal band Manilla Road. It was released in 1985 on the Black Dragon record label, rather than the band's own label, Roadster Records, which they had used on their previous releases.

In 2019, Metal Hammer ranked it as the 6th best power metal album of all time.

Track listing 
All songs written by Mark Shelton.
 "Metalstorm" – 5:17
 "Open the Gates" – 2:20
 "Astronomica" – 4:59
 "Weavers of the Web" – 4:17
 "The Ninth Wave" – 9:30
 "Heavy Metal to the World" – 3:19
 "The Fires of Mars" – 6:13
 "Road of Kings" – 5:46
 "Hour of the Dragon" – 4:44
 "Witches Brew" – 6:20

Note
The 2001 digipak includes live versions of "Open the Gates" and "Witches Brew".

Personnel 
Band
Mark Shelton – vocals, guitar
Scott Park – bass
Randy Foxe – drums

Production
Manilla Road – producer
Max Merhoff – assistant producer
Rick Fisher – assistant producer
Larry Funk – engineering
Eric Larnoy – illustration
Nick Newbill – artwork

References 

Manilla Road albums
1985 albums